The Jewish Journal of Greater Los Angeles, known simply as the Jewish Journal, is an independent, nonprofit community weekly newspaper serving the Jewish community of greater Los Angeles, published by TRIBE Media Corp. The Journal was established in 1985. As of 2016 it had a verified circulation of 50,000 and an estimated readership of 150,000; it is the largest Jewish weekly outside New York City. TRIBE Media Corp. also produces the monthly TRIBE magazine, distributed in Santa Barbara, Malibu, Conejo, Simi and West San Fernando Valleys.

History
Though independently incorporated, the paper was initially distributed in part by the Jewish Federation of Greater Los Angeles. The first issue appeared on February 28, 1986. The editor was Gene Lichtenstein, who served until 2000, and the first art director was Katherine Arion, a Romanian-born artist who came to the United States in 1981. After becoming completely independent from the Jewish Federation in 2005, it went through difficulties and its circulation shrunk. Circulation has recovered to 50,000 since then, and the paper has undertaken new initiatives, including expanded internet offerings, live events, a branding and marketing division, JJ Branding, TRIBE magazine, launched in December 2009, and Jewish Insider. The Jewish Journal, like other news media, faced financial pressures (cutting staff positions and salaries  during 2009, though since it has resumed growth in both areas), but it strengthened its financial situation in May 2010, when it received commitments from a group of local Jewish philanthropists for additional funding intended to assure its continuing financial viability.

In 2015, Tribe Media Corp. acquired Jewish Insider, a daily news service based in Washington, D.C. that was started by Max Neuberger. In 2021, Jewish Insider acquired eJewish Philanthropy.

As of at least 1999, David Suissa is the editor-in-chief and president of the Journal''. Contributing writers include Rabbi Bradley Shavit Artson, Karen Lehrman Bloch, Judea Pearl, Tabby Refael, Rabbi Yoshi Zweiback, and Jonathan Kirsch, who also serves as Book Editor. Shmuel Rosner is Senior Political Correspondent.

In the wake of the Charlie Hebdo terrorist attack, the issue of January 16–22, 2015 was renamed "Jewish Hebdo".

Circulation, readership, and reception 
It received awards from the Los Angeles Press Club in 2005 and 2009.

As of May 2016, the site reported about 4 million unique users per month.

See also 
 History of the Jews in Los Angeles

References

External links
 Jewish Journal Official website

Jewish newspapers published in the United States
Jewish websites
Jews and Judaism in Los Angeles
Newspapers published in Greater Los Angeles
Publications established in 1985
1985 establishments in California
Weekly newspapers published in California